Mixing Colours is a collaborative studio album by English brothers Roger Eno and Brian Eno. It was released on 20 March 2020 under Deutsche Grammophon.

While they worked together on Apollo, this album marks the first time that the brothers have made a full album together.

Critical reception
Mixing Colours was met with generally favourable reviews from critics. At Metacritic, which assigns a weighted average rating out of 100 to reviews from mainstream publications, this release received an average score of 72, based on 11 reviews. Album of the Year assessed the critical consensus as 74 out of 100 based on 12 reviews.

Track listing

Charts

References

2020 albums
Brian Eno albums
Collaborative albums